In 1997, Australian singer-songwriter Sia released her debut studio album, entitled OnlySee. She released her second album, Healing Is Difficult, in 2001. The album yielded three singles: "Taken for Granted", "Little Man" and "Drink to Get Drunk". Sia was also part of English band Zero 7, and performed vocals on their albums in the early 2000s; she left the group in 2008.

In 2004, Sia released her third studio album, Colour the Small One. Its singles included "Don't Bring Me Down", "Breathe Me", "Where I Belong", "Sunday", and "Numb". In 2008, her fourth studio album, Some People Have Real Problems, was released. The album spawned four singles: "Day Too Soon", "The Girl You Lost to Cocaine", "Soon We'll Be Found" and "Buttons". Its follow-up, We Are Born, was made available in 2010 and spawned the singles "You've Changed", "Clap Your Hands", "Bring Night" and "I'm in Here".

In 2011, Sia was featured on the successful singles "Titanium" by David Guetta and "Wild Ones" by Flo Rida. In 2013, she contributed the song "Elastic Heart" to the soundtrack of the 2013 American film The Hunger Games: Catching Fire. A year later, she released her sixth, breakthrough studio album, 1000 Forms of Fear. Four singles were released from it; "Chandelier", "Big Girls Cry", Sia's solo version of "Elastic Heart", and "Fire Meet Gasoline".

Sia's seventh album, This Is Acting, was released on 29 January 2016. It generated the singles "Alive", her first Billboard Hot 100-topping hit "Cheap Thrills" (solo or featuring singer/rapper Sean Paul), "The Greatest" and "Move Your Body". Sia left RCA Records and signed with Atlantic Records in 2017; she released Everyday Is Christmas in November of that year. It was re-released with new bonus tracks in three following years (2018, 2021, and 2022). In 2018, she formed LSD, a supergroup with Labrinth and Diplo; their debut album was released in April 2019 and included the singles "Genius", "Audio", "Thunderclouds", "Mountains" and "No New Friends".

Sia's ninth studio album Music – Songs from and Inspired by the Motion Picture was released on 12 February 2021. It spawned the singles "Together", "Courage to Change", "Hey Boy" (solo or featuring Burna Boy) and "Floating Through Space" (with David Guetta).

Throughout her career, Sia has recorded and released collaborations with many artists, including Eminem, Wiz Khalifa, Leslie Odom Jr., Angel Haze, Beck, Lior, Giorgio Moroder, Ozuna, Doja Cat, BTS, Barney McAll, Gims, Brooke Candy and Kanye West.

Released songs

Notes

References

Sia